This is a list of logarithm topics, by Wikipedia page. See also the list of exponential topics.
 Acoustic power
 Antilogarithm
 Apparent magnitude
 Baker's theorem
 Bel
 Benford's law
 Binary logarithm
 Bode plot
 Henry Briggs
 Bygrave slide rule
 Cologarithm
 Common logarithm
 Complex logarithm
 Discrete logarithm
 Discrete logarithm records
 e
 Representations of e
 El Gamal discrete log cryptosystem
 Harmonic series
 History of logarithms
 Hyperbolic sector
 Iterated logarithm
 Otis King
 Law of the iterated logarithm
 Linear form in logarithms
 Linearithmic
 List of integrals of logarithmic functions
 Logarithmic growth
 Logarithmic timeline
 Log-likelihood ratio
 Log-log graph
 Log-normal distribution
 Log-periodic antenna
 Log-Weibull distribution
 Logarithmic algorithm
 Logarithmic convolution
 Logarithmic decrement
 Logarithmic derivative
 Logarithmic differential
 Logarithmic differentiation
 Logarithmic distribution
 Logarithmic form
 Logarithmic graph paper
 Logarithmic growth
 Logarithmic identities
 Logarithmic number system
 Logarithmic scale
 Logarithmic spiral
 Logarithmic timeline
 Logit
 LogSumExp
 Mantissa is a disambiguation page; see common logarithm for the traditional concept of mantissa; see significand for the modern concept used in computing.
 Matrix logarithm
 Mel scale
 Mercator projection
 Mercator series
 Moment magnitude scale
 John Napier
 Napierian logarithm
 Natural logarithm
 Natural logarithm of 2
 Neper
 Offset logarithmic integral
 pH
 Pollard's kangaroo algorithm
 Pollard's rho algorithm for logarithms
 Polylogarithm
 Polylogarithmic function
 Prime number theorem
 Richter magnitude scale
 Grégoire de Saint-Vincent
 Alphonse Antonio de Sarasa
 Schnorr signature
 Semi-log graph
 Significand
 Slide rule
 Smearing retransformation
 Sound intensity level
 Super-logarithm
 Table of logarithms
 Weber-Fechner law

Exponentials

Logarithm topics